Khama is the name of the royal family of the Bamangwato people of Botswana. As such, it may refer to:

Khama III (1837? – 1923), kgosi (chief/king) of the Bamangwato people of Bechuanaland (now Botswana)
Semane Setlhoko Khama (1881 – 1937), mohumagadi (queen) of the Bamangwato people of Bechuanaland, fourth wife of Khama III
Tshekedi Khama (1905 – 1959), regent of the Bamangwato tribe in 1926 after the death of Sekgoma II 
Seretse Khama (1921 – 1980), the first President of Botswana, in office from 1966 to 1980
Sir Seretse Khama International Airport, named after the above
Ruth Williams Khama (1923 – 2002), wife of Seretse Khama, First Lady of Botswana from 1966 to 1980
Ian Khama (1953), first-born son of Seretse and Ruth Williams Khama and President of Botswana from 2008 to 2018
Tshekedi Khama II (1958), son of Seretse and Ruth Williams Khama and a Botswana MP

Other people with this name:
Khama Billiat, a Zimbabwean professional footballer

In astronomy, 1357 Khama is a main-belt asteroid discovered on July 2, 1935 by Cyril Jackson.

Khama can also be a transliteration of Hebrew חַמָּה (chammah), meaning "heat"/"rage". When used as a proper noun, it can refer to both Mercury as well as the Sun.

See also
 Karma, called "kamma" in Pali
 Kama, another concept from Indian religious thought
 Kamma (disambiguation)
 Cama (disambiguation)
 Qama, a short Persian sword
 Kahma, an Indian village
 Pentti Kahma, a retired discus thrower from Finland
 Kham, a historical region of Tibet
 Khamag Mongol, a major Mongolic tribal confederation in the 12th century
 Khamaj, a parent scale in Hindustani music
 Khamal (disambiguation)
 Khaman, an Indian dish
 Khamar, a village in Yemen
 Khamar Monastery, a Buddhist center in Mongolia
 Khamas, an Iranian village
 Khamas (raga)
 Birkat Hakhama, a Jewish blessing thanking God for creating the sun
 Khame Mi, the first chief queen consort of King Swa Saw Ke of the Ava Kingdom
 Khami, the now-ruined capital of the pre-colonial Kingdom of Butua
 Khamir (disambiguation)
 Khamis (disambiguation)
 Khamo, a village in Myanmar
 Khamachon, an Indian village
 Khamaneh, an Iranian city
 Khammam, an Indian city
 Khammu/Khmu, an ethnic group of Southeast Asia
 Ayya Khema, a Buddhist teacher
 Khoma, a progressive/alternative metal musical group from Sweden
 Khamsa (disambiguation)
 Kshama Sawant, an American socialist politician
 Khanna (disambiguation)